David Adika is an Israeli photographer and educator.

Biography 
David Adika (דוד עדיקא) was born in Jerusalem in 1970. He lives and works in Tel Aviv. Adika graduated from Bezalel Academy of Art and Design in 1997, receiving BFA. He received MFA in 2004, graduating from joint educational program of Bezalel Academy of Art and Design and Hebrew University Advanced Studies Program. He was appointed head of photography department of Bezalel Academy of Art and Design in January 2018.

Academic roles 
 1999–present: Bezalel Academy of Art and Design, Jerusalem. Professor.
 2004–present: Shenkar College of Engineering and Design, Ramat Gan. Professor
 2010–present: School of the Arts Campus Arison, Tel Aviv. Head of the Visual Arts Department.
 2018–present: Bezalel Academy of Art and Design, Jerusalem. Head of Department of Photography.

Exhibitions

Solo 
 2016 Table studies - Museo Morandi, Bologna. 
 2014 As In Water Face Reflects Face - Latvian National Museum of Art, Riga.
 2013 As In Water Face Reflects Face - The Open Lens Gallery, Braverman Gallery, Tel Aviv
 2012 Equator - The Open Lens Gallery, The Gershman Y, University of the Arts, Philadelphia [Curator: Jordan Rockford]
 2011 Oululu - East Central Gallery, London
 2010 Living Room - Helena Rubinstein Pavilion, Tel Aviv Museum of Art [Curator: Hadas Maor]
 2009 Every Monkey is a Gazelle in Its Mother’s Eyes - Braverman Gallery, Tel Aviv (Artist Book)
 2007 Come Thou Beauty - 3 solo shows, The Art Gallery, University of Haifa [Curator: Ruti Direktor]
 2006 Fix (‘Tikkun’) - Braverman Gallery, Tel Aviv
 2006 After Winter Must Come Spring - Q! Gallery, Glasgow International Festival of Contemporary Visual Art [Curator: Rancis McKee]
 2005 In–Out - Ashdod Museum of Art, Monart Center [Curator: Yona Fischer]
 2004 Multi-Function - Graduation Show, Bezalel Gallery, Tel Aviv
 2004 Will It Shine - Kav 16 Gallery, Tel Aviv [Curator: Galia Yahav]
 2004 Works - Neta Eshel – House for Art, Caesarea (with Gal Weinstein)
 2003 Mahogany - Herzliya Museum of Contemporary Art, Herzliya [Curator: Dalia Levin]
 2002 Mother Tongue/Portraits - Hagar Gallery, Jaffa [Curator: Tal Ben-Zvi]
 2002 Sacker Garden - Oranim Gallery, Tivon (with Eli Petel) [Curator: David Wakstein]
 2001 Lifestyle - Borochov Gallery, Tel Aviv; in collaboration with the Photography Department Bezalel Academy of Art and Design, Jerusalem [Curator: Sharon Yaari]

Group 

1998
 To the East -Orientalism in the Arts in Israel - Israel Museum, Jerusalem [Curators: Yigal Zalmona, Tamar Manor-Friedman]

2003
 Tel Aviv-Glasgow-Tel Aviv - Bezalel Gallery, Tel Aviv, in cooperation with GSA (Glasgow School of Arts) [Curator: Nachum Tevet]
 Mother Tongue - Museum of Art, Ein Harod [Curator: Tal Ben-Zvi]
 Matter of Taste - The Israel Museum, Jerusalem [Curator: Hagit Allon]

2004
 Alphabet - Israelisk Samtidskonst, Kristinehamns Konstmuseum, Sweden [Curator: Tali Cederbaum]
 Lets Food - Bat Yam Museum of Art, Bat Yam
 Omanut Haaretz - (Art of the Land) Festival, Tel Aviv [Curator: Ruti Director]
 Animal, Vegetable, Mineral - Bezalel Gallery, Tel Aviv [Curator: Nachum Tevet]
 Pets - Time for Art – Center for Contemporary Art, Tel Aviv [Curator: Tali Cederbaum]
 In Days Gone By, At this Time - Rubin Museum, Tel Aviv [Curator: Carmela Rubin, Shira Naftali]
 The Scream 2 - Homage Exhibition to Edvard Munch’s “The Scream”, Kav 16 Gallery, Tel Aviv [Curator: Galia Yahav]

2005
 Prizes in Art and Design from the Ministry of Education, Culture and Sport - 2004, Tel Aviv Museum of Art [Curator: Ellen Ginton]
 Artic 7 - Recipients of the Sharett scholarship for Young Israeli Artists, The Museum of Israeli Art, Ramat Gan
 Yona at Bezalel - Issues in Contemporary Curating, Bezalel Gallery, Tel Aviv [Curators: Sarit Shapira, Sandra Weill]
 Reunion - Braverman Gallery, Tel Aviv [Curator: Yani Shapira]

2006
 3rd Generation - Photography in Estate of Identity Crises, Minshar Gallery, Tel Aviv [Curator: Yair Barak]
 Present Now, Omanut Haaretz Festival - Reading Power Station, Tel Aviv [Curator: Tal Ben-Zvi]
 Incorrigible Young & Restless Romantics, Noga Gallery of Contemporary Art, Tel Aviv [Curator: Jossef Krispel]
 El Hama’ayan - The Yarkon Stream as a Cross-Section in the Israeli Metropolis, Tel Aviv Museum of Art [Curators: Meira Yagid Haimovici, Nathalie Kertesz, Ze’ev Maor]

2007
 Through the Object - The Open Museum of Photography, Tel Hai Industrial Park [Curator: Naama Haikin]
 Somewhere Better Than this Place - Braverman Gallery, Tel Aviv [Curator: Sally Haftel Naveh]
 The Rear - The 1st Herzliya Biennial of Contemporary Art, Herzliya [Curator: Joshua Simon]
 New Acquisitions - Haifa Museum of Contemporary Art, Haifa [Curator: Tami Katz-Freiman]

2008
 Territoires - The 6th Biennale of International Photography, Liege - Belgium [Curator: Dorothee Luczak]

2009
 Watermelons - Rubin Museum, Tel Aviv [Curator: Carmela Rubin, Shira Naftali]
 David and the Girls - POV Festival of Contemporary Photography, Tel Aviv [Curator: David Adika]
 4 Openings in Israeli Art - Salame Gallery, Tel Aviv [Curator: Ruti Direktor]
 Faces: Inside and Out - Eretz Israel Museum, Tel Aviv [Curators: Danna Taggar Heller]
 Maximalism - Avni Institute - Tel Aviv [Curator: Aline Alagem]
 Solace - Inga Gallery, Tel Aviv [Curator: David Adika]
 Tel Aviv Time, Tel Aviv Museum of Art, Tel Aviv [Curator: Nili Goren]

2010
 Looking In, Looking Out - The Window in Art, Israel Museum, Jerusalem [Curator: Hagit Allon]
 Memoria Technica - eastcentral gallery, London [Curator: Adi Gura]
 Stop Making Sense - Oslo Fine Art Society [Curator: Marianne Hultman]
 Shelf Life - Haifa Museum of Art [Curators: Tami Katz-Freiman, Rotem Ruff]
 With This Ring - Beth Hatefutsoth, Tel Aviv [Curator: Raz Samira]
 True Colors  - Soho Gallery, London. The Cube Gallery, Manchester [Curator: Daniel Cahana Levinson]

2011
 Jerusalem Beach - The Artists’ Studios - Art Cube Gallery, Jerusalem [Curator: Iris Mendel]
 Nimrod’s Descendants - Jerusalem Artists’ House Gallery, Jerusalem [Curator: Gideon Ofrat]

2012
 The Winners - The Minister of Culture Award for Fine-Art Artist, Ministry of Science, Culture and Sport, Jerusalem.  Petach-Tikava museum of Contemporary Art  [Curator: Naomi Aviv]
 Making Room, Contemporary Israeli Photography, From the Museum Collection - Tel Aviv Museum Of Art, [Curator: Nili Goren] 
 Archive  - Fresh Paint Art Fair, Special Project [Curator: Iris Rivkind]

2013
 Lot's Wife - The Photographic Gaze, The Open Museum of Photography [Curator: Naama Haikin]
 Curator - Yona Fischer, Beginnings of Collection, Ashdod Museum of Art, Monart Center [Curators: Yuval Beaton, Roni Cohen-Binyamini]
 Human Nature - Braverman Gallery, Tel Aviv [Curator: Adi Gura]
 Night Stamp - "Beit Ha'ir museum", Tel Aviv [Curator: Claudette Zoree, Ayelet Bitan Shlonski]

2017
 Regarding Africa: Contemporary Art and Afro-Futurism. Tel Aviv Art Museum.

Scholarships and awards 

 The Minister of Culture Award for Fine Art Artist, Ministry of Science, Culture and Sport, Jerusalem, 2011
 The Jack Nailor Award for Photography, Haifa Film Festival, 2011
 Sharet Scholarship, America-Israel Cultural Foundation, 2005
 Young Artist Award, Ministry of Science, Culture and Sport, Jerusalem, 2004
 P.S.S. Pilot Summer School, Glasgow School of Arts, Scotland Foreign Ministry and British Council, 2003
 Dean’s Award, yearly scholarship, Bezalel Academy of Art and Design, Jerusalem, 1996
 Dean’s Award, yearly scholarship, Bezalel Academy of Art and Design, JerusalemMulti-Function, Graduation, 1995

References

External links 
David Adika

Israeli photographers
Living people
Israeli educators
Artists from Jerusalem
1970 births
Israeli LGBT photographers
21st-century Israeli LGBT people